Events from the year 1137 in Ireland.

Incumbents
High King: Toirdelbach Ua Conchobair

Events
 Church in Boyounagh burned
 Gilla Meic Liac mac Diarmata becomes Archbishop of Armagh